Reiffsburg is an unincorporated community in Harrison Township, Wells County, in the U.S. state of Indiana.

History
Reiffsburg was named after John Reiff, who platted the community.

A post office was established at Reiffsburg in 1854, and remained in operation until it was discontinued in 1905.

Geography

References

Unincorporated communities in Wells County, Indiana
Unincorporated communities in Indiana